Tomorrow Will Never Come is a 2003 EP by American metal band Agalloch. It was released by The End Records in a limited edition of 500 copies, hand-initialed by bassist Jason William Walton.

Track listing

Information
When asked about the title track ("Tomorrow Will Never Come") during a lecture at the University of Victoria, Agalloch guitarist Don Anderson said:

"It’s a song that is close to me in many ways. The idea was developed during a time when I was very interested in schizophrenia and the mentally ill. The sample was taken from a documentary I watched whilst taking a 'domain of the sciences & society' course at the university. We were studying medicine and the mentally ill. We watched this video (from the prof's personal library) and I was incredibly moved by the son's conversation with his father. I wanted to use it for Sculptured originally, but this track really provided a better opportunity for it."

References

Agalloch albums
2003 EPs